Ellenbergia is a genus of flowering plants in the family Asteraceae.

There is only one known species, Ellenbergia glandulata, endemic to the Cuzco region of Peru. It is listed as endangered.

References

Endangered plants
Eupatorieae
Monotypic Asteraceae genera
Endemic flora of Peru